Vincent Le Goff (born 15 October 1989) is a French professional footballer who plays as a left-back for Lorient.

References

External links
 
 
 Vincent Le Goff foot-national.com Profile

1989 births
Living people
Sportspeople from Quimper
French footballers
Footballers from Brittany
Association football defenders
Ligue 1 players
Ligue 2 players
Championnat National players
Championnat National 2 players
Stade Lavallois players
La Vitréenne FC players
FC Istres players
FC Lorient players